The Grossaktion Warsaw ("Great Action") was the Nazi code name for the deportation and mass murder of Jews from the Warsaw Ghetto during the summer of 1942, beginning on 22 July. During the Grossaktion, Jews were terrorized in daily round-ups, marched through the ghetto, and assembled at the Umschlagplatz station square for what was called in the Nazi euphemistic jargon "resettlement to the East". From there, they were sent aboard overcrowded Holocaust trains to the extermination camp in Treblinka.

The largest number of Warsaw Jews were transported to their deaths at Treblinka in the period between the Jewish holidays Tisha B'Av (23 July) and Yom Kippur (21 September) in 1942. The killing centre had been completed  from Warsaw only weeks earlier, specifically for the Final Solution. Treblinka was equipped with gas chambers disguised as showers for the "processing" of entire transports of people. Led by the SS-leader Brigadeführer Odilo Globocnik, the campaign, codenamed Operation Reinhard, became the critical part of the Holocaust in occupied Poland.

History
The Nazi police conducted most of the mass deportations of the ghetto inmates to Treblinka via pendulum trains carrying up to 7,000 victims each. Every day, trains consisting of overcrowded boxcars departed twice from the railway collection point (Umschlagplatz in German); the first in the early morning, and the second in the mid-afternoon. The extermination camp received most of the victims between 23 July and 21 September 1942. The Grossaktion (large-scale operation) was directed in the capital by SS- und Polizeiführer Ferdinand von Sammern-Frankenegg, the commander of the Warsaw area since 1941.

The turning point in the life of the Ghetto was 18 April 1942, marked by a new wave of mass executions by the SS.

Deportations
On 19 July 1942, SS Chief Heinrich Himmler ordered Friedrich-Wilhelm Krüger, the SS commander in charge of the General Government, to carry out the 'resettlement of the whole Jewish population of the General Government by 31 December 1942.' Three days later on 22 July 1942 the German SS, headed by the "Resettlement Commissioner" Sturmbannführer Hermann Höfle, called a meeting of the Ghetto Jewish Council Judenrat and informed its leader Adam Czerniaków about the "resettlement to the East". Czerniakow, who committed suicide after learning of the plan, was replaced by Marc Lichtenbaum. The population of the Ghetto was not informed about the real state of affairs. Only by the end of 1942 did they understand that the deportations, overseen by the Jewish Ghetto Police, were to the Treblinka death camp and not for the purpose of resettlement.

During the two months of summer 1942, about 254,000 – 265,000 Ghetto inmates, men, women and children, were sent to Treblinka and exterminated there (or at least 300,000 by different accounts, possibly, with the inclusion of the Ghetto falling considered by many a part of the operation). The sheer death toll among the Jewish inhabitants of the Ghetto during the Grossaktion would have been difficult to compare even with the liquidation of the Ghetto in the spring of the next year during and after the Ghetto Uprising, during which around 50,000 people were killed. The Grossaktion resulted in the death of five times as many victims. The actual razing of the ghetto did not result in the destruction of the Jewish population of Warsaw as much as had the Grossaktion of the summer of 1942.

For eight weeks the rail shipments of Jews to Treblinka went on without stopping: 100 people to a cattle truck, 5,000 to 6,000 each day, including hospital patients and orphanage children. Dr Janusz Korczak, a famed educator, went with them in August 1942. He was offered a chance to escape from the deportations by Polish friends and admirers, but he chose instead to share the fate of his people. On arrival at Treblinka, victims were stripped of their clothes and directed to one of ten chambers disguised as showers. There they were gassed to death in batches of 200 with the use of monoxide gas (Zyklon B was introduced at Auschwitz some time later). In September 1942, new gas chambers were built at Treblinka, which could kill as many as 3,000 people in just 2 hours. Civilians were forbidden to approach the area.

Many of the remaining Jews in the Warsaw Ghetto decided to fight, and many were helped by the Polish underground. The Jewish Combat Organization (ŻOB) was formed in October 1942 and tasked with resisting any future deportations. It was led by 24 year–old Mordechai Anielewicz. Meanwhile, the Polish Home Army, Armia Krajowa (AK), began to smuggle weapons, ammunition and supplies into the Ghetto for the uprising. Von Sammern-Frankenegg was relieved of duty by Heinrich Himmler on April 17, 1943 and replaced with SS- und Polizeiführer Jürgen Stroop. Stroop took over from von Sammern-Frankenegg because of his unsuccessful offensive against the Ghetto underground.

Ferdinand von Sammern-Frankenegg, in charge of the Grossaktion, was court-martialed by Himmler on 24 April 1943 for his ineptitude and sent to Croatia, where he died in a partisan ambush. Jürgen Stroop was awarded the Iron Cross First Class by the supreme commander of the Wehrmacht, Field Marshal General Wilhelm Keitel, for his "murder expedition" (Alfred Jodl). After the war, Stroop was tried for war crimes by the Americans, convicted, and sentenced to death. His execution was not carried out; instead, he was handed over to the Polish authorities for re-trial. He was again convicted and sentenced to death in Poland and executed at the site of the Warsaw Ghetto on 8 September 1951.

Timeline of events

See also
 Jewish ghettos in German-occupied Poland
 Gross Aktion in the Kovno Ghetto, known as Kaunas massacre of October 29, 1941

References

1942 in Poland
History of Warsaw
Operation Reinhard
Treblinka extermination camp
Warsaw Ghetto
Mass murder in 1942
Holocaust massacres and pogroms in Poland